The Rafah Governorate is a Governorate of Palestine in the southernmost portion of the Gaza Strip. Its district capital or muhfaza is the city of Rafah located on the border with Egypt. According to the Palestinian Central Bureau of Statistics the governorate had a population of 171,363 in mid-year 2006. It contains the closed down Yasser Arafat International Airport.

Localities
 al-Bayuk
 al-Mawasi
 Kherbit al-Adas
 al-Qarya as-Suwaydiya
 Rafah (capital)
 Shokat as-Sufi

Refugee camps
Tel al-Sultan
Rafah Camp

References 

 http://www.lib.utexas.edu/maps/middle_east_and_asia/gaza_strip_1999.jpg
 http://www.pcbs.gov.ps/Portals/_pcbs/populati/pop16.aspx

 
Governorates of the Palestinian National Authority in the Gaza Strip